Tarlo is a locality in the Southern Tablelands of New South Wales, Australia in Upper Lachlan Shire. It is located south of the township of Taralga, on the road to Goulburn.

The Tarlo River and Tarlo River National Park and Cookbundoon Nature Reserve are located within the suburb of Tarlo.

References 

Towns in New South Wales
Southern Tablelands
Upper Lachlan Shire
Goulburn Mulwaree Council